Mustafa Özkan(born 1 December 1986), better known by his stage name Manuş Baba, is a Turkish pop and arabesque singer. He studied at the Tarsus Turgut İçgören primary school in Tarsus. His family later moved from Diyarbakir to Antalya, due to his father's job as a seasonal worker in Antalya. He studied at Antalya Gazi High School and Akdeniz University. He started his music career with his band Güneşe Yolculuk in 2010. He also has had a number of hit albums in Turkey, including Bu Havada Gidilmez, Dönersen Islık Çal and İki Gözümün Çiçeği.

Discography
Albums
Dönersen Islık Çal (2017)
İki Gözümün Çiçeği (2019)

Singles
"Aşkın Kederi" (2016)
"İstanbul" (2016)
"Değmez" (2017)
"Dayanamam" (2020)
"Bir Tek Sensin İçimde" (2020)
"Dam Üstüne Çul Serer" (2020)

References

1986 births
Turkish pop singers
Turkish-language singers
People from Mersin
21st-century Turkish male singers
Living people